Christoforos Liontakis (1945 – 26 July 2019) was an award-winning Greek poet and translator. He read law at the University of Athens and philosophy of law at the Sorbonne, in Paris. His first collection of poems was published in 1973.

He belonged to the so-called Genia tou 70, a literary term referring to Greek authors who began publishing their work during the 1970s, especially towards the end of the Greek military junta of 1967-1974 and during the first years of the Metapolitefsi.

For his collection of poems With the Light, published in 1999, he received the Greek National Book Award for the Year 2000 and the poetry prize of the prestigious literary journal Diavazo. The French Ministry of Culture honored him with its Knighthood of Arts and Letters, and the municipality of Heraklion awarded him the Nikos Kazantzakis Literary Prize.

Liontakis died on 26 July 2019.

Poetry
 Το τέλος του τοπίου (The end of the landscape), 1973
 Μετάθεση (Transference), 1976
 Υπόγειο γκαράζ (Underground Garage), 1978
 Ο Μινώταυρος μετακομίζει (The Minotaur Moves), 1982
 O ροδώνας με τους χωροφύλακες (Rose Garden with the Gendarmes), 1988
 Με το φως (With the Light), 1999

Prose
 Νυχτερινό γυμναστήριο (Nocturnal Gymnasium), 1993

Selected translations
Stendhal, Αρμάνς (Armance), 1978
Bonnefoy, Yves, Οι τάφοι της Ραβέννας (Les Tombeaux de Ravenne), 1981
Genet, Jean, Ο σκοινοβάτης, 1986
Rimbaud, Arthur, Μια εποχή στην Κόλαση (Une Saison en Enfer), 2004

Notes

External links
His entry for the 2001 Frankfurt Book Fair (Greek)
His page at the website of the Hellenic Authors' Society (Greek)
His page at Kastaniotis Publishers (English)

1945 births
2019 deaths
Writers from Heraklion
National and Kapodistrian University of Athens alumni
University of Paris alumni
Cretan poets
Greek male poets
20th-century Greek poets
20th-century Greek male writers
21st-century Greek poets
21st-century Greek male writers
Greek translators
20th-century translators